The 2001–02 season was the 72nd season in the existence of FC Gueugnon and the club's third consecutive season in the second division of French football. In addition to the domestic league, FC Gueugnon competed in this season's edition of the Coupe de France and Coupe de la Ligue. The season covered the period from 1 July 2001 to 30 June 2002.

Players

First-team squad

Transfers

In

Out

Competitions

Overall record

French Division 2

League table

Results summary

Results by round

Matches

Coupe de France

Coupe de la Ligue

Statistics

Squad statistics

|-
! colspan=14 style=background:#dcdcdc; text-align:center|Goalkeepers

|-
! colspan=14 style=background:#dcdcdc; text-align:center|Defenders

|-
! colspan=14 style=background:#dcdcdc; text-align:center|Midfielders

|-
! colspan=14 style=background:#dcdcdc; text-align:center|Forwards

|-
! colspan=14 style=background:#dcdcdc; text-align:center| Players who have made an appearance or had a squad number this season but have left the club

|}

Goalscorers

References 

FC Gueugnon seasons
FC Gueugnon